Redux: The First 10 Years is an album of re-recordings by Canadian post-hardcore band Silverstein, released in 2019 independently by the band themselves.  The album consists of 12 re-recorded songs from their first four albums which were released in their first ten years as a band.

Background and recording
Silverstein formed in February 2000 in Burlington, Ontario. Silverstein released two EPs, Summer's Stellar Gaze (2000) and When the Shadows Beam (2002) independently, then on October 22, 2002, it was announced that the band had signed to Victory Records.  The band released four albums on Victory in their first ten years after forming: When Broken Is Easily Fixed (2003), Discovering The Waterfront (2005), Arrivals & Departures (2007), and A Shipwreck In The Sand (2009). Liam Cormier of Cancer Bats reprises his guest vocal role on "Vices".

Release
Redux: The First 10 Years was announced 15 February 2019 through the band's website.  It was announced that the album would contain 12 brand new recordings of popular tracks from their first four albums.  The tracklist was revealed shortly after.  It was also announced that it would be the first album the band released themselves independently of a label.  The album was released 12 April 2019.

"Smashed into Pieces" had been previously re-recorded by the band in 2013 the ten-year anniversary of the album; the band assured fans that the version on Redux was a new version recorded with the rest of the album in 2018.

Tracklist

Personnel
Personnel per booklet.

 Silverstein
Shane Told – vocals, additional guitar
Paul Koehler – drums
Paul Marc Rousseau – lead guitar
Josh Bradford – rhythm guitar
Billy Hamilton – bass guitar

 Additional musicians
Chris Schembri – additional guitar and lyrics (track 3)
Liam Cormier – vocals (track 6)
Mike Tompa – violin, cello, mellotron

 Production 
Kyle Marchant – sound engineer
Mike Kalajian – mastering 
Sam Guaiana – production, mixing, sound engineer

References

External links

Redux: The First Ten Years at YouTube (streamed copy where licensed)

Silverstein (band) albums
2019 albums